Catherine Ann Skinner  (born 11 February 1990) is an Australian sport shooter. In 2016, she became an Olympic gold medalist.

Early life 
Skinner was born to Ken and Anne Skinner. She has two brothers, Andrew and Craig.

Career 
Skinner won Australia's only shooting medal at the 2013 Summer Universiade when she won gold in the trap event. She competed in the women's trap event at the 2014 Commonwealth Games where she reached the semifinals. She competed in the women's trap event at the 2016 Summer Olympics and won a gold medal. Skinner missed out on the finals in the women's trap at the 2018 Commonwealth Games, finishing in 8th place.

Personal life 
Skinner graduated from RMIT in 2015, with a degree in Chemical Engineering. She found her studies challenging, taking a total of eight years to complete due to the fact that she was travelling to compete. She worked at Dow Chemical for three months in 2017.

References

External links

1990 births
Australian female sport shooters
Living people
Shooters at the 2014 Commonwealth Games
Olympic shooters of Australia
Shooters at the 2016 Summer Olympics
Olympic gold medalists for Australia
Olympic medalists in shooting
Medalists at the 2016 Summer Olympics
Recipients of the Medal of the Order of Australia
Universiade medalists in shooting
Universiade gold medalists for Australia
Universiade silver medalists for Australia
Universiade bronze medalists for Australia
Medalists at the 2011 Summer Universiade
Medalists at the 2013 Summer Universiade
Medalists at the 2015 Summer Universiade
Commonwealth Games competitors for Australia
20th-century Australian women
21st-century Australian women
People educated at Firbank Girls' Grammar School
Sportswomen from Victoria (Australia)
RMIT University alumni